Courtney Rhodes Reed (born August 10, 1984) is an American actress, best known for originating the role of Princess Jasmine in Disney's Aladdin on Broadway.

Early life 
Reed was born and raised in Elgin, Illinois to a Caucasian American father and a mother of Vietnamese descent who was born and raised in Thailand. She began performing at age 6, playing a mouse in Children's Theatre of Elgin's production of Cinderella. She was later cast as the title role in a community production of Annie, which inspired her to pursue theater as a professional career. She studied at the Chicago College of Performing Arts at Roosevelt University as a Musical Theatre Major, also participating in their theatre conservatory. She considered moving to LA, believing Broadway success could only start with television fame. However, she was quickly cast in roles on the stage.

Career 
Reed performed on Broadway as an understudy for Lisa and Ali in the musical Mamma Mia! She was also on Broadway in In The Heights, performing as the understudy/replacement for the roles of Vanessa, Nina, and Carla.

In 2011, she began performing in the original cast of the musical Aladdin as Princess Jasmine at the 5th Avenue Theatre in Seattle. In 2012, the musical put on several regional and international productions, and was given a Toronto tryout the following year. Reed stayed in the role of Princess Jasmine when Aladdin opened on Broadway at the New Amsterdam Theatre on March 20, 2014 and took her final bow on January 11, 2018. She later went on to reprise the role in the North American Tour, for a limited engagement, and once again in the West End production as part of its closing cast in 2019. Reed returned to the Broadway production for a limited engagement beginning October 16, 2019 and took her final bow as Princess Jasmine on October 27, 2019.

In September of 2021 she was cast as Satine in the North American touring cast of Moulin Rouge! The Musical, starring along side Conor Ryan as Christian. 

Other roles include the role of Candy 1 in the 2007 film Crime Fiction and Ryder in the 2014 film A New York Love Story.

Reed's TV appearances include Law & Order: SVU as the villainous Alana Gonzalez in the episode, "Above Suspicion." She also appeared in episodes of White Collar and The Affair.

Reed is also the creator of the company Gagged Chokers. The company features a collection of chokers themed by seasons and holidays, among others.

Filmography

References

External links 
 
 

21st-century American actresses
American women singers
People from Elgin, Illinois
Actresses from Illinois
Living people
American musical theatre actresses
American people of Vietnamese descent
1984 births